Thurso railway station is a railway station located in Thurso, in the Highland council area in the far north of Scotland. It serves the town of Thurso and its surrounding areas in the historic county of Caithness. It is the northernmost station on the National Rail network.

The station is situated at the end of a short branch line off the Far North Line.

Thurso station is managed by ScotRail, which also operates all trains serving the station.

History
The station opened on 28 July 1874. A wrought-iron turntable,  in diameter, was built at the station by the Railway Steel and Plant Company of Manchester.

The station was threatened with closure in the 1960s under the Beeching Axe.

In the age of locomotive-hauled trains prior to the introduction of diesel multiple units by British Rail, a locomotive was based at Georgemas Junction to take the Thurso portion to and from the junction. The practice of splitting trains ended when s were introduced on the line  since then all services run in full between Inverness and Wick via Thurso, in both directions, meaning they call at Georgemas Junction twice.

Facilities
There is one platform, which is long enough to accommodate a nine-carriage train. The station is fully wheelchair-accessible, but it is not monitored by CCTV. The station has a ticket office, although there are no self-service ticket machines , except for some smartcard validators. Other facilities include: a small car park, a sheltered bike stand, a payphone, waiting rooms, toilets and a post box.

There is a bus stop located directly outside the station, although the majority of bus services call at the nearby Miller Academy stop,  to the north.

Passenger volume 

The statistics cover twelve month periods that start in April.

Services

Despite being located at the end of the branch line, Thurso is not the terminus for any passenger services. On Sundays the frequency drops to just two trains per day to Georgemas Junction, of which one goes to Inverness and one to Wick.

An hourly shuttle between Wick and Thurso making use of Vivarail's Class 230 Battery Multiple Units has been proposed by the Friends of the Far North line, but to this date nothing has been confirmed.

References

Bibliography

External links

RAILSCOT article on Sutherland and Caithness Railway
RAILSCOT page on Thurso
ScotRail North Highlands Timetable

Railway stations in Caithness
Railway stations served by ScotRail
Railway stations in Great Britain opened in 1874
Former Highland Railway stations
Railway stations serving harbours and ports in the United Kingdom
Category B listed buildings in Highland (council area)
Listed railway stations in Scotland
Thurso
Cardinal points of the Great British railway network